Eighth Wonder or 8th Wonder may refer to:

Eighth Wonder of the World, a historical term

Music

Groups
Eighth Wonder (band), an English pop band formed in 1983

Albums
Eighth Wonder (album), a 2013 album by Japanese pop group AAA
8th Wonder (album), a 1982 album by the Sugarhill Gang
Feel gHood Muzik : The 8th Wonder, a 2009 album released by Drunken Tiger

Songs
"8th Wonder" (song), by the Sugarhill Gang (1980)
"8th Wonder" (Gossip song), a 2009 song by Gossip on the album Music for Men
"Eighth Wonder" (Lemon Demon song), a 2009 song by Lemon Demon on the 2016 album Spirit Phone
"8th World Wonder", the 2004 debut single by Kimberley Locke

Other uses
The Eighth Wonder, an opera by Alan John

See also
Wonders of the World (disambiguation)